Shamas Faqir (  شمس فقیر) was a Kashmiri Sufi poet. He belonged to the Qadiriyya silsila of Sufism.

Shamas Faqir was born in 1843, to a poor family in Chinkral Mohalla, Habba Kadal Srinagar, Kashmir. He didn't receive formal education, but became apprenticed to Niama Saeb, a Kashmiri Sufi poet. He became a disciple of Souch Maliar, Abdul Rehman of Barzulla, Atiq-Ullah of Gulab Bagh, Mohammad Jammal and Rasool Saeb.

When aged 25 he left for Amritsar, in the Indian Punjab, where he became a disciple of another Sufi Saint. After his return from Amritsar he lived in Anantnag, Kashmir, where he married. He returned to his ancestral home in Srinagar for some time, subsequently meditating for six months in a cave at Qazi Bagh in the Budgam district of Kashmir. Following this he lived in Braripora Krishpora.

Many of his poems are on the theme of a mystic's quest for the primal cause of the universe. Shamas Faqir's poems used the Kashmiri idiom of his time, and also words from Persian, Arabic and Sanskrit. His poem Merajnama recounts Mohammed's spiritual journey to God.

Shamas Faqir died in 1901, and was buried at Krishpora Shamasabad Budgam Kashmir. He had two sons and a daughter.
Shamas Faqir's grand sons Sheikh Peer Mehraj ud din (Aasi Shamas) and his younger brother Sheikh Peer Mohammad Altaf (sons of Sheikh Peer Gh Mohidin Sahib (RAH)kamli wali presently at his place.Sheikh Peer Mehraj ud din (aasi shamas) is also a poet (shayar).

References

Further reading
Aziz, Afaq (2002), Kulliyyat-e Shams  Faqir (Complete Works of Shams  Faqir), Srinagar: Nund Rishi Cultural Society
Mamoon, Khalil & Shafi Shauq (2006), Kashmiri Sufi Shairi (Kashmiri Sufi Poetry), Srinagar: All India Urdu Munch
Habib, Aamir (2015), "The Mystics and the Idea of Kashmiri Composite Culture: A Study of Prakash Ram Bhat and Shams Faqir, M.Phil. diss., Jamia Millia Islamia

Sufi poets
1843 births
1901 deaths
19th-century poets
Kashmiri poets
People from Srinagar district
Kashmiri Sufi saints
Sufi teachers